This article lists notable program transformation systems by alphabetical order:
ASF+SDF
CIL (for C)
Coccinelle (for C)
DMS
Fermat 
Joose (JavaScript)
JetBrains MPS
Moose (Perl)
Nemerle
Rascal Metaprogramming Language
Spoon (for Java) 
Stratego/XT
TXL

References

The Program transformation Wiki
Transformation Technology Bibliography

Program transformation
Computer programming